Solheim is a small village in Gloppen Municipality in Vestland county, Norway. It takes about 40 minutes to drive from Solheim to the nearby towns of Førde (to the south) and Florø (to the west). The village of Eimhjellen lies about  almost straight east of Solheim, across the lake. There are a lot of fish in the lake, especially trout.

Solheim is mainly an agricultural area and is home to many farmers. Compared to the surrounding villages, Solheim is a sunny place (not shaded by any large mountains), which gives the village its name Solheim, meaning "home of the sun".  Solheim had a school until 2009, but it is now closed.  The local students must travel to another school a little farther away. The old school building is now used as a local community house for parties and gatherings.

References

Villages in Vestland
Gloppen